Yaakov Ferdman (born 12 October 1954) is a Belarusian-Israeli former épée fencer and coach (1985–1990) of the Belarusian national fencing Junior and Cadet teams. Today, he is the founder & head coach of Maccabi Ma'alot Fencing Club, and member of the Israeli national fencing team coaching staff.

Biography 
Yaakov Ferdman was born and raised in Polotsk, Belarus. He has a master's degrees in Mechanical Engineering from Polotsk University. He began his fencing journey in 1972 during his university studies. In 1980, he founded a fencing club in his hometown. In 1985, he was selected to coach the Belarusian national épée team, which he coached until he immigrated to Israel in 1990.

Upon his arrival in Israel he settled with family in Akko (Acre), where he worked as a fencing coach. During his first 3 years, he worked in the Hapoel Akko fencing club, managed by its head coach Chaim Hatuel. In 1993, he moved with his family to Ma'alot-Tarshiha. First, he established a fencing class in local high school “ORT Ma'alot” where he worked as a physical education teacher.

The Israeli national team has established its professional home in Maccabi Ma'alot Fencing Club, and is regularly conducting training camps there for all age groups. In addition, the Russian and Estonian national fencing teams have visited already visited Ma'alot twice in the past, and continue to have professional collaboration with Maccabi Ma'alot and Yaakov Ferdman. Among the fencers coached by Yaakov Ferdman are: Anastasia Ferdman, Alona Komarova, Dana Strelnikova, Vera Kanevsky, Anna London, Nickole Tal, and more.

Personal life 
Married with two daughters, Anastasia Ferdman and Alina Ferdman.  Both former Israeli national épée champions, and winners of many local and international medals and trophies.

1954 births
Living people
Belarusian fencers
Belarusian male épée fencers
Israeli fencers
Israeli male épée fencers
Soviet male épée fencers